Antoinette Harrell (born c. 1960) is an American historian, genealogist, and civil rights activist. She is known for her research on the post-slavery peonage of African-American sharecroppers in the southern United States.

Career 
Much of Harrell's work involves tracing the lineage of African-American families in the southern United States, where they were often subject to local and state laws, known as Black Codes, that made it possible for whites to retain control over them, often in conditions that were reminiscent of those during the existence of chattel slavery. Harrell had been active in local genealogical research in Louisiana since around 1994, when she began researching her own family's history as slaves. She began giving lectures on the subject, and was approached by a woman (Mae Louise Miller) who stated that she had been enslaved up until recently in Mississippi. Mae Louise Miller’s life story came to light when she spoke to Harrell about it; Harrell highlighted it in the short documentary The Untold Story: Slavery in the 20th Century (2009), which Harrell executive produced. According to testimony gathered by Harrell, conditions like this persisted through the 20th century, with some people remaining trapped in debt bondage through the 1970s, a notable instance being a family held on a modern-day plantation in Killona, Louisiana. As a family historian, Harrell conducts this research by interviewing living descendants and families of people who were subjected to these 20th-century debt bondage systems, as well as by reviewing deeds, census information, and records from local archives and libraries and even those from the National Archives in Washington, D.C.

Harrell has been involved in lawsuits pertaining to the history of slavery and forced debt bondage of African Americans, including a class action suit brought by Louisiana residents against corporations that were known to have historically financed or otherwise benefited from slavery, including Aetna Insurance, CSX Railroad, and Lloyd's of London. Most of the defendant corporations were involved in the insurance or transportation industries, and were alleged to be liable for having insured, transported, or owned slaves.

Materials collected by Harrell, including photographs and recorded oral histories, are kept in a collection by Southeastern Louisiana University. Her research is also archived at the Amistad Research Center at Tulane University, in New Orleans. She has publicized her research through numerous books, as well as a local access television show called Knowing Your Family History, and has hosted Youth Genealogy Camps, where students are able to trace family histories through the same methods that she uses in her research.

Bibliography

References

External links 

 Peonage Detective - Antionette Harrell's website

Living people
1960 births
American genealogists
American civil rights activists
African-American historians
21st-century African-American people
20th-century African-American people